Lieutenant Colonel Eric Charles Twelves Wilson VC (2 October 1912 – 23 December 2008) was an English British Army officer and colonial administrator. He received the Victoria Cross, the highest and most prestigious award for gallantry in the face of the enemy that can be awarded to British and Commonwealth forces. At the time of his death, he was last surviving British Army recipient of the Victoria Cross in the Second World War, and the earliest and oldest recipient.

Early life
Wilson was born at Sandown on the Isle of Wight, where his father Cyril Charles Clissold Wilson was a curate. His mother's maiden name was Twelves. His grandfather Charles Thomas Wilson was the first missionary from the Church Mission Society to visit Buganda, in 1877. He was educated at Marlborough College, where fees were reduced for the sons of clergymen, and he became a house captain. Although he wore glasses, he was awarded a prize cadetship to attend the Royal Military College, Sandhurst.

Military career
Wilson was commissioned as a second lieutenant in The East Surrey Regiment on 2 February 1933. He was promoted to the rank of lieutenant in 1936 and was seconded to the 2nd (Nyasaland) Battalion The King's African Rifles in 1937 serving in East Africa, where he learned to speak Nyanja. He was then seconded to the Somaliland Camel Corps in 1939.

In August 1940, Wilson was 27 years old, and by then an acting captain attached to the Somaliland Camel Corps, when Italian forces commanded by General Guglielmo Nasi invaded British Somaliland (now Somaliland). During the Italian conquest of British Somaliland the heavily outnumbered British-led forces made their stand on the hills around Tug Argan. During this battle, from 11 to 15 August 1940 at Observation Hill, Captain Wilson kept a Vickers machine-gun post in action in spite of being wounded and suffering from malaria. Some of his guns were blown to pieces by the enemy's field artillery fire, and his spectacles were smashed. He was wounded in the right shoulder and the left eye, and he was assumed to have been killed. For his actions, likened in the Daily Sketch to another Rorke's Drift, Wilson was awarded the Victoria Cross.

Wilson has the rare distinction of being mistakenly awarded a "posthumous" VC, announced in The London Gazette on 16 October 1940. At the time the award was made, he was believed to be missing in action, presumed dead. He had, however, been captured by the Italians. An official report in The Times on 16 October indicated that he had survived, but another captured officer was surprised to find the "late" Captain Wilson still alive in a prisoner of war camp in Eritrea.

In 1941, when the Italian forces in East Africa surrendered following the East African Campaign, Wilson was released from captivity. He returned to England and received his Victoria Cross at Buckingham Palace in July 1942. With his captain's rank made permanent in 1941, and with the rank of temporary major, he served as adjutant of the Long Range Desert Group and then as second in command of the 11th (Kenyan) King's African Rifles, part of the 25th East African Brigade in 11th East African Division, in the Burma Campaign. Having contracted scrub typhus he was hospitalised for two months and then returned to East Africa to command an infantry training establishment at Jinja in Uganda. He was promoted to acting lieutenant-colonel in June 1945 and was seconded to The Northern Rhodesia Regiment in 1946. He retired from the Army in 1949 and although at this time his permanent rank was major, he was granted the honorary rank of lieutenant-colonel.

Victoria Cross citation
The formal citation for Wilson's VC, published in the London Gazette in October 1940 when he was still presumed dead, reads:

Later life 
Wilson married Ann Pleydell-Bouverie (a descendant of the Earls of Radnor) in 1943. They had two sons. After they divorced in 1953, Wilson married Angela Joy Gordon, and they had one son.

After Wilson left the Army in 1949, he joined the Overseas Civil Service in Tanganyika. He learned several African languages, and served in Tanganyika until independence of the British East African countries which led to his retirement in 1961.

In 1962 Wilson was appointed Deputy Warden of London House, a residence at Goodenough Square in the Bloomsbury district of London. This residence is for university graduates from the Commonwealth of Nations pursuing graduate studies in the United Kingdom. In 1966 Wilson was promoted to Warden of London House, holding the position until he retired in 1977, after which he lived in Stowell, Somerset.

At the time of his death, he was one of only ten Victoria Cross recipients still alive. He was the last surviving British Army recipient of the Second World War, as well as being the earliest and oldest recipient. His VC is on display in the Lord Ashcroft Gallery at the Imperial War Museum, London.

He suffered from prostate cancer in later life, and died after a stroke. He was buried in Stowell, survived by his second wife and their son, and both of his sons from his first marriage.

See also
East African campaign (World War II)
Italian conquest of British Somaliland
List of solved missing person cases

Footnotes

References
British VCs of World War 2 (John Laffin, 1997)
Monuments to Courage (David Harvey, 1999)
The Register of the Victoria Cross (This England, 1997)
 Roger T. Stearn, 'Wilson, Eric Charles Twelves (1912–2008)", Oxford Dictionary of National Biography, (Oxford University Press, 2012) [accessed 5 Oct 2012]

External links
British Army Officers 1939−1945
Captain E.C. Wilson in The Art of War exhibition at the UK National Archives

 Imperial War Museum Interview

1912 births
2008 deaths
Burials in Somerset
People from Sandown
People educated at Marlborough College
Graduates of the Royal Military College, Sandhurst
East Surrey Regiment officers
British Army personnel of World War II
British colonial governors and administrators in Africa
British World War II recipients of the Victoria Cross
Somaliland Camel Corps officers
King's African Rifles officers
British Army recipients of the Victoria Cross
Military history of British Somaliland during World War II
Tanganyika (territory) people
Missing in action of World War II
British World War II prisoners of war
Formerly missing people
World War II prisoners of war held by Italy
Military personnel from the Isle of Wight